Willem Rudolph Appollus (born 23 September 1946 in Keetmanshoop, ǁKaras Region) is a Namibian politician and schoolteacher. Appollus joined SWAPO in the late 1980s and was one of the two representatives of ǁKaras Region in the National Council of Namibia from 2004 to 2010.

Career
Appollus began teaching in Oosterheim Junior Secondary School in Aroab, Karas Region in 1975. From 1984 to 1986, he received teacher training in Oudtshoorn, Cape Province, South Africa. He returned to Aroab and taught there until 2004. In 1998, Appollus was elected to the Local Authority for Aroab, where he served until 2004. In that year, he was elected to represent Keetmanshoop Rural in the ǁKaras Regional Council, and simultaneously the ǁKaras Region in the National Council. He served in the National Council from 2004 to 2010 and he did not seek re-election in 2010. The seat was won by Jims Christian, also of SWAPO.

References

1946 births
Living people
People from Keetmanshoop
SWAPO politicians
Members of the National Council (Namibia)
Namibian educators
Namibian expatriates in South Africa